Bill Jones was an American football player and coach. He served as the head football coach at Carroll College in Helena, Montana, from 1931 to 1932.
Prior to that, he was a player (1926 to 1927) and assistant coach (1929 to 1930) at the University of Notre Dame under head coach Knute Rockne.

References

Year of birth missing
Year of death missing
Notre Dame Fighting Irish football players
Notre Dame Fighting Irish football coaches
Carroll Fighting Saints football coaches
Sportspeople from Sioux City, Iowa
Players of American football from Iowa
American football guards